The 2002 season was the New York Giants' 78th in the National Football League (NFL) and their sixth under head coach Jim Fassel. The team improved upon their 7–9 record from the previous season by three games and returned to the playoffs for the second time in three years, ending the season on a four-game winning streak. After a midseason slump, head coach Jim Fassel stripped offensive coordinator Sean Payton of playcalling duties, and the Giants went on to a winning streak that would carry them to the playoffs. Leading 35–14 in the third quarter of the NFC wild-card came at San Francisco, Jeremy Shockey dropped a touchdown pass forcing a field goal to make the score 38–14. Fassel decided to rest starting running back Tiki Barber to save him for the next round, but the 49ers gained momentum, and the Giants did not score again, losing the game 39–38. Following the season, Payton was not retained; he won the Super Bowl seven years later as the head coach of the New Orleans Saints.

Offseason

NFL Draft

Undrafted free agents

Staff

Roster

Regular season

Schedule

Game summaries

Week 1: vs. San Francisco 49ers

at Giants Stadium, East Rutherford, New Jersey

 Date: September 5
 Game time: 8:30 p.m. EST
 TV: ESPN
 Announcers: Mike Patrick, Joe Theismann, Paul Maguire, and Suzy Kolber

The Giants opened their 2002 season at home against the 49ers, in a preview of their infamous Wild Card game later that season. This was the first-ever Thursday night NFL season opener.

The Giants led 6–3 at halftime, with new kicker Matt Bryant kicking field goals of 29 and 33 yards. In the third quarter, 49ers quarterback Jeff Garcia found running back Garrison Hearst for a 9-yard touchdown pass to make it 10–6. After a Jose Cortez field goal made it 13-6 49ers with 8 minutes to go, Tiki Barber ran in for a 1-yard touchdown to tie the game at 13–13 with 1:55 to go. However, the Giants defense failed to hold at the end of the game. A 33-yard pass from Garcia to Terrell Owens set up a 36-yard field goal by Cortez with 6 seconds left to win the game for the 49ers.

For the Giants, Amani Toomer caught nine passes for 134 yards.

Week 2: at St. Louis Rams

at Edward Jones Dome, St. Louis, Missouri

 Date: September 15
 Game time: 3:05 p.m. CST (4:05 p.m. EST)
 TV: FOX
 Announcers: Joe Buck, Cris Collinsworth, Troy Aikman, and Pam Oliver

The Giants next traveled to St. Louis to take on the defending NFC champion Rams, who were favored by 12 to defeat the Giants. However, the Giants jumped out to a 17–0 lead in the first half. In the second quarter, Kerry Collins found rookie tight end Jeremy Shockey for his first career touchdown on a 28-yard pass. Later in the quarter, Jason Sehorn picked off Kurt Warner and returned his errant pass 31 yards for a touchdown. The Rams finally got on the board with Warner finding receiver Ricky Proehl for a 6-yard touchdown to make the score 17–7 Giants at the half.

In the third quarter, Marshall Faulk scored a touchdown to narrow the score to 17–14. After two Matt Bryant field goals, Faulk scored another touchdown from 8 yards out to make the score 23–21 with 8:24 to go. The Giants finally clinched the game when cornerback Will Allen intercepted a Kurt Warner pass with 1:43 remaining.

Kerry Collins was 22 of 26 for 307 yards and a touchdown with an interception. Ike Hilliard was the leading receiver with 4 receptions for 97 yards, while Amani Toomer added 4 catches for 92 yards. The defense forced 4 Rams turnovers against just one by the Giants.

Week 3: vs. Seattle Seahawks

at Giants Stadium, East Rutherford, New Jersey

 Date: September 22
 Game time: 4:15 p.m. EST
 TV: FOX
 Announcers: Sam Rosen, Bill Maas, and Brent Ringenbach

Next came a contest against the Seahawks that did not feature a touchdown. The Giants trailed 6–0 at halftime after two Rian Lindell field goals, but Matt Bryant kicked three field goals in the second half, the last one a 47 yarder coming with 2:04 remaining. As he had the previous week, Will Allen clinched the game by intercepting a Trent Dilfer pass with 1:35 remaining.

The Giants held the Seahawks to just 145 yards of total offense. Amani Toomer caught four passes for 100 yards.

Week 4: at Arizona Cardinals

at Sun Devil Stadium, Tempe, Arizona

 Date: September 29
 Game time: 2:05 p.m. MST (4:05 p.m. EST)
 TV: FOX
 Announcers: Dick Stockton, Daryl Johnston, and Ron Pitts

The Giants completed their NFC West cycle with a poor performance against the Cardinals. The Giants struck first with Tiki Barber running in for a 6-yard touchdown in the first quarter. However, in the second quarter, Kerry Collins was intercepted by Justin Lucas, who returned the pick 38 yards for a touchdown to tie the score at 7–7 at the half. In the fourth quarter, Cardinals running back Marcel Shipp scored two touchdowns. The first one was on a 7-yard pass from quarterback Jake Plummer to give the Cardinals a 14–7 lead with 10:36 to go, and the second touchdown was a 10-yard run to clinch the game with 2:13 left.

Both teams gained 263 yards in this contest. However, the Cardinals won the turnover battle 3–1 and time of possession 36:05 to 23:55.

Week 5: at Dallas Cowboys

at Texas Stadium, Irving, Texas

 Date: October 6
 Game time: 12:00 p.m. CST (1:00 p.m. EST)
 TV: FOX
 Announcers: Pat Summerall, Brian Baldinger, and Mike Doocy

Week 6: vs. Atlanta Falcons

at Giants Stadium, East Rutherford, New Jersey

 Date: October 13
 Game time: 1:00 p.m. EST
 TV: FOX
 Announcers: Kenny Albert, Daryl Johnston, and Ron Pitts

Week 8: at Philadelphia Eagles

at Veterans Stadium, Philadelphia, Pennsylvania

 Date: October 28
 Game time: 9:00 p.m. EST
 TV: ABC
 Announcers: Al Michaels, John Madden and Melissa Stark

Week 9: vs. Jacksonville Jaguars

at Giants Stadium, East Rutherford, New Jersey

 Date: November 3
 Game time: 8:30 p.m. EST
 TV: ESPN
 Announcers: Mike Patrick, Joe Theismann, Paul Maguire, and Suzy Kolber

Week 10: at Minnesota Vikings

The Giants took on the Vikings in a midseason contest at the Metrodome. The Giants took charge early, with Kerry Collins finding Charles Stackhouse for a 1-yard touchdown to make the score 7–0. In the second quarter Ron Dayne ran in for a 30-yard touchdown, with a failed two-point conversion making the score 13–3 at the half. Late in the third quarter, Collins found Amani Toomer for an 11-yard touchdown, and the Giants led 19–6 at the start of the fourth quarter. While the Giants flourished offensively, Vikings quarterback Daunte Culpepper struggled mightily. He completed just 9 of 20 passes, with many of his passes not even close to reaching his receivers. Due to his inability to perform and lack of confidence in this contest, Vikings coach Mike Tice decided to have him take the rest of the day off.

To replace Culpepper, Tice put in Todd Bouman, a local product from St. Cloud State University. Immediately after he went in, the Vikings' fortunes changed. Early in the fourth quarter, Bouman threw a 48-yard bomb to Randy Moss, which set up a 1-yard touchdown by running back Moe Williams. The lead was now 19–13 Giants. On the next Vikings possession, the Vikings ran a draw play where the fastest man in the NFL, Michael Bennett, took off for a 78-yard touchdown. With 8:36 to go, the Vikings were now leading 20–19 in a contest the Giants had dominated. The Giants recovered, however, and Tiki Barber ran in for an 8-yard touchdown with 2:43 to go. On the two-point conversion, the Giants were thrown a life preserver when a Vikings player dropped an interception, with rookie tight end Marcellus Rivers catching the loose ball to make the score 27–20 Giants. The Giants forced a punt on the next Vikings possession when Kenny Holmes sacked Bouman on a third down play to essentially clinch the game.

Kerry Collins was 25 of 35 for 300 yards and two touchdowns with an interception. Tiki Barber added 127 yards on 24 carries with a touchdown, and Ron Dixon caught four passes for 107 yards.

Week 11: vs. Washington Redskins

at Giants Stadium, East Rutherford, New Jersey

 Date: November 17
 Game time: 1:00 p.m. EST
 TV: FOX
 Announcers: Kenny Albert, Tim Green, and John DiScepolo

Week 12: at Houston Texans

at Reliant Stadium, Houston, Texas

 Date: November 24
 Game time: 3:15 p.m. CST (4:15 p.m. EST)
 TV: FOX
 Announcers: Sam Rosen, Bill Maas, and Matt Sampsell

Week 13: vs. Tennessee Titans

at Giants Stadium, East Rutherford, New Jersey

 Date: December 1
 Game time: 1:00 p.m. EST
 TV: CBS
 Announcers: Kevin Harlan, Randy Cross, and Beasley Reece

Week 14: at Washington Redskins

at FedEx Field, Landover, Maryland

 Date: December 8
 Game time: 1:00 p.m. EST
 TV: FOX
 Announcers: Dick Stockton, Daryl Johnston, and Dave Feldman

Week 15: vs. Dallas Cowboys

at Giants Stadium, East Rutherford, New Jersey

 Date: December 15
 Game time: 4:15 p.m. EST
 TV: FOX
 Announcers: Pat Summerall, Brian Baldinger, and John DiScepolo

Week 16: at Indianapolis Colts

at RCA Dome, Indianapolis, Indiana

 Date: December 22
 Game time: 1:00 p.m. EST
 TV: FOX
 Announcers: Joe Buck, Troy Aikman, Cris Collinsworth, and Pam Oliver

After two games against teams with losing records, the Giants' schedule got tougher with a road game at Indianapolis. However, the Giants would be up to the challenge in a shootout.

The Giants took a 3–0 lead in the first quarter with a 20-yard Matt Bryant field goal. The first play of the second quarter was when this game took off. Kerry Collins threw a screen pass to Jeremy Shockey, who ran over and flattened Colts safety David Gibson before finally being brought down at the Colts' 14-yard line after a 24-yard gain. Shockey's takedown of Gibson was all the more embarrassing for the Colt as he declared before the game that Shockey was "just another player." Three plays later, Tiki Barber ran in for a 4-yard touchdown. The score was 10–3 Giants at the half, but some noted that the Giants should have been up by more as two lost fumbles hindered their offense.

On the first play of the second half came the play of the game. The Giants ran a flea flicker where Tiki Barber took a handoff before throwing the ball back to Kerry Collins, who then launched a rocket (starting from his own 5-yard line, Collins' pass landed inside the Colts' 40) to Amani Toomer, who outran the already embarrassed David Gibson for an 82-yard touchdown. On the next Giants drive, they extended their lead with Collins finding Charles Stackhouse for an 18-yard touchdown to make the score 24–3. With 11 seconds to go in the third quarter, Tiki Barber ran in for a 1-yard touchdown. The score was 30–6 Giants heading into the fourth quarter.

With 13:34 to go in the fourth quarter, the Colts finally got into the end zone with Peyton Manning finding Reggie Wayne for a 21-yard touchdown to make it 31–12 Giants. The Giants answered with Kerry Collins finding Amani Toomer for a 21-yard touchdown to make the score 37–12. However, after this touchdown the Giants defense and special teams began to blow their seemingly insurmountable lead. The Colts needed just six plays to drive 77 yards for a touchdown, with Manning finding Marvin Harrison for a 25-yard touchdown. The ensuing two-point conversion made the score 37–20 with 4:51 to go. The Colts needed an onside kick, and Colts kicker Mike Vanderjagt lofted a kick up and over the Giants frontlines with the Colts recovering the ball. On the very next play, Manning found Reggie Wayne for another Colts touchdown. Suddenly with 4:44 to go, the Giants led by just 10, 37–27. However the Giants recovered the ensuing onside kick before facing a 3rd and 11. Rather than play it safe and run the ball to kill the clock, Jim Fassel called for another pass play. The gamble paid off with Collins hitting Toomer for his third touchdown of the day, a 27-yard touchdown that finally put the game away with 4:00 to go.

Kerry Collins achieved a perfect passer rating of 158.3, going 23 of 29 for 366 yards and four touchdowns with no interceptions. Amani Toomer caught 10 passes for 204 yards and a career-high three touchdowns, with Jeremy Shockey adding 7 receptions for 116 yards. Kenny Holmes registered two sacks for the Giants defense.

Not only did the Giants remain in playoff contention with their win over the Colts, but they gained help from an unlikely source. While this game was taking place, the lowly 1–13 Cincinnati Bengals came from behind and stunned the New Orleans Saints. As a result of this game, the Giants were now ahead of the Saints in playoff standings.

Week 17: vs. Philadelphia Eagles

at Giants Stadium, East Rutherford, New Jersey

 Date: December 28
 Game time: 1:30 p.m. EST
 TV: FOX
 Announcers: Joe Buck, Cris Collinsworth, Troy Aikman, and Pam Oliver

Standings

Postseason

Prelude: Giants sign Trey Junkin
While the Giants made the postseason in 2002 after a one-year absence, throughout the season the Giants struggled on special teams, particularly with stability at the long snapper position. The Giants began the season with Bob Jones as their long snapper, but after he struggled the Giants signed Dan O'Leary, who was the long snapper for the final five games of the regular season until he was injured. Before the Giants' Wild Card playoff game with the 49ers, Jim Fassel made the decision to sign Trey Junkin, who had played 19 seasons with Buffalo, Washington, the Raiders, Seattle, and Arizona. Junkin had been cut before the beginning of the season by the Cowboys and had retired before the Giants signed him. Of particular note was an NFL Films video featuring a segment on him and his job as a long snapper late in his career; he stated in the interview that he had made only "two bad snaps" in his career.

Schedule

Game summaries

Wild Card Round: at San Francisco 49ers

at 3Com Park, San Francisco, California

 Date: January 5, 2003
 Game time: 1:45 p.m. PST (4:45 p.m. EST)
 TV: FOX
 Announcers: Joe Buck, Troy Aikman, Cris Collinsworth, and Pam Oliver

The 2002 Giants season ended in one of the most humiliating losses in franchise history, featuring a blown 24 point lead and a catastrophic finish featuring both an epic special teams blunder and a controversial officiating call.

The game essentially unfolded in three phases: an evenly matched beginning, the Giants turning the game into a rout, and the 49ers' comeback.

The Giants won the toss and drove on their opening possession to the 49ers' 33-yard line, but Kerry Collins threw an interception to 49ers linebacker Julian Peterson to end the drive. On the 49ers' first play from scrimmage, Jeff Garcia found Terrell Owens, who broke away from the Giants' secondary and took off for a 76-yard touchdown. The Giants got on the board with 18 seconds left in the quarter, with Collins finding Amani Toomer for a 12-yard touchdown to tie the score 7–7 at the end of the first quarter. The Giants scored another touchdown early in the second quarter with a 2-yard touchdown pass from Collins to Jeremy Shockey for their first lead of the game, 14–7. The 49ers tied the game up with 6:05 left to go in the first half, with running back Kevan Barlow scoring a rushing touchdown.

It was during the final minutes of the first half when the Giants began to build their big lead. The Giants drove down on their ensuing drive for another touchdown, with Kerry Collins finding Amani Toomer for an 8-yard touchdown with 2:49 to go in the first half. After a Jeff Garcia interception to Jason Sehorn, Collins threw yet another touchdown to Toomer for his third touchdown reception of the game, and the Giants led 28–14 at the half. On the opening possession of the second half, the 49ers faced a 4th-and-1 when Dhani Jones stopped 49ers fullback Fred Beasley for no gain. The Giants scored again, with Tiki Barber running in for a 6-yard touchdown. On their next possession, the Giants advanced to the 49ers' 3-yard line for a goal-to-go situation. On 3rd-and-goal, Collins threw a pass directly to Jeremy Shockey, but Shockey dropped the pass and the Giants were forced to settle for a 21-yard Matt Bryant field goal. The Giants were up 38–14 with 4:27 to go in the third quarter, but their momentum had been stopped with Shockey's dropped pass. This play is widely considered to be the turning point in the game.

The 49ers began their comeback with 2:10 to go in the third quarter, when Jeff Garcia found Terrell Owens for a 26-yard touchdown pass. A two-point conversion from Garcia to Owens made it 38–22 heading into the final quarter. After a terrible punt by Matt Allen and an unnecessary roughness penalty on Dhani Jones, the 49ers had great field position at the Giants' 27 to start their next drive, and they cashed in with Garcia running in for a 14-yard touchdown, followed by another two-point conversion from Garcia to Owens. Suddenly, with 14:55 to go in the game, the Giants were only leading 38–30. After another three-and-out by the Giants, the 49ers drove into the Giants' red zone again with a chance to tie the game, when the Giants finally held and the 49ers settled for Jeff Chandler's 25-yard field goal with 7:52 to go. The Giants finally got a drive going after the play, which put the Giants into field goal range with 3:06 to go when their special teams began to unravel. Long snapper Trey Junkin, signed only a few days before the game, sent a low snap into the dirt, resulting in Matt Bryant missing the 42-yard field goal attempt wide left. The 49ers then drove 68 yards down the field, with Garcia finding Tai Streets for a 13-yard touchdown with 1:05 to go. The Giants were now losing a game they had been winning by 24 points, 39–38. As if blowing a seemingly insurmountable lead was not enough, the Giants were losing composure on the field as well, with Shaun Williams getting into a confrontation with Owens, resulting in offsetting unsportsmanlike conduct penalties.

Although the Giants had blown their huge lead, they had one more chance to save their season. Kick returner Delvin Joyce returned the ensuing kickoff 32 yards to give the Giants good field position at their own 48-yard line. Kerry Collins found Ron Dixon for 10 yards, then after his next pass was nearly intercepted by cornerback Ahmed Plummer, he found Dixon for 19 yards. With 9 seconds left, the Giants ran a quick out to Amani Toomer for 5 more yards, setting up a 41-yard field goal attempt on the last play of the game. What instead ensued was one of the worst plays in Giants history. Trey Junkin launched a poor snap into the dirt, to the point that holder Matt Allen could not get the ball down. Realizing that Bryant could not kick the field goal, Allen rolled out and threw a Hail Mary towards Rich Seubert, an offensive lineman who checked in as an eligible receiver for the play. As the ball neared, 49ers defensive end Chike Okeafor dragged down Seubert, which should have resulted in a pass interference against the 49ers and one more attempt for Bryant, since the game cannot end on a defensive penalty. However, the refs not only did not call pass interference on Okeafor, but instead called ineligible receiver downfield on Seubert, even though he in fact was an eligible receiver. As a result, the game was over.

The blown lead and ending ruined several outstanding individual performances by the Giants. Kerry Collins went 29 of 43 for 342 yards and 4 touchdowns with an interception, while Amani Toomer caught 8 passes for 136 yards and 3 touchdowns and Tiki Barber added 177 yards from scrimmage with a touchdown. The most notable stat from the game, however, related to total yards: Both the Giants and the 49ers were dead even with 446 yards of total offense.

The day after the game, the NFL admitted that the penalty on the final play was incorrectly called. Their statement declared that Rich Seubert's penalty should not have been called, and that Chike Okeafor should have been called for pass interference, meaning that the Giants would have gotten one more chance to win the game. However, when a reporter revealed this to 49ers coach Steve Mariucci after the game, he simply replied, "Bummer," as there was no way the final outcome could be changed.

Trey Junkin, the long snapper who botched the snap on the final play, promptly retired for good immediately after the game. He was deeply distraught about his role in the team's loss and solely blamed himself for the outcome, though many did note that he was hardly the only factor.

The 2002 Wild Card against the 49ers is among the most devastating losses in Giants history not only for its comeback and ending, but also because of the impact on the team. The following season, the Giants fell to 4–12 and tied for last place in the entire league. Critics noted that similar to this game, the 2003 Giants had a penchant for blowing leads, even on the rare occasions where they won. After the season, Jim Fassel was fired and Kerry Collins was released, than signed with the Oakland Raiders, while many key defensive starters left. As a result, the Wild Card against the 49ers would retrospectively be seen by Giants fans as the beginning of the end of the Jim Fassel era.

References

New York Giants seasons
New York Giants
New York Giants season
21st century in East Rutherford, New Jersey
Meadowlands Sports Complex